Union is a town in Neshoba and Newton counties, Mississippi. The population was 1,988 at the 2010 census.

Geography
Union is located at  (32.571320, -89.118118). Most of the town is in Newton County with a portion extending north into adjacent Neshoba County. In the 2000 census, 1,496 of the town's 2,021 residents (74.0%) lived in Newton County and 525 (26.0%) in Neshoba County.

According to the United States Census Bureau, the town has a total area of 3.4 square miles (8.9 km), all land.

Demographics

2020 census

As of the 2020 United States Census, there were 2,042 people, 838 households, and 569 families residing in the town.

2000 census
As of the census of 2000, there were 2,021 people, 780 households, and 509 families residing in the town. The population density was 589.0 people per square mile (227.5/km). There were 884 housing units at an average density of 257.6 per square mile (99.5/km). The racial makeup of the town was 62.84% White, 35.53% African American, 0.35% Native American, 0.20% Asian, 0.05% from other races, and 1.04% from two or more races. Hispanic or Latino of any race were 0.64% of the population.

There were 780 households, out of which 31.8% had children under the age of 18 living with them, 43.1% were married couples living together, 18.8% had a female householder with no husband present, and 34.7% were non-families. 32.3% of all households were made up of individuals, and 18.1% had someone living alone who was 65 years of age or older. The average household size was 2.46 and the average family size was 3.12.

In the town, the population was spread out, with 27.2% under the age of 18, 8.6% from 18 to 24, 23.1% from 25 to 44, 19.7% from 45 to 64, and 21.5% who were 65 years of age or older. The median age was 38 years. For every 100 females, there were 79.0 males. For every 100 females age 18 and over, there were 74.0 males.

The median income for a household in the town was $21,696, and the median income for a family was $28,542. Males had a median income of $26,667 versus $17,328 for females. The per capita income for the town was $12,176. About 28.4% of families and 35.2% of the population were below the poverty line, including 49.7% of those under age 18 and 37.4% of those age 65 or over.

Education
The Town of Union is served by the Union Public School District.

Notable people
 Trent Kelly, member of the U.S. House of Representatives from Mississippi's 1st congressional district
 Billy Nicholson, member of the Mississippi House of Representatives
 William Redd, businessman and philanthropist

References

Towns in Mississippi
Towns in Neshoba County, Mississippi
Towns in Newton County, Mississippi